Cervocerus is a deer genus that lived about 7 million years ago, at the boundary between the Miocene and Pliocene periods. Cervocerus novorossiae was found in China and the Republic of Moldova.

External links 
 Cervocerus on data.gbif.org

Prehistoric deer
Pliocene even-toed ungulates
Prehistoric animals of China
Fossil taxa described in 1913
Prehistoric even-toed ungulate genera